Dorcadion inspersum is a species of beetle in the family Cerambycidae. It was described by Holzschuh in 1982. It is known from Turkey.

References

inspersum
Beetles described in 1982